Trackshittaz were an Austrian hip-hop band from Mühlviertel, made up of Lukas Plöchl (a.k.a. G-Neila) and Manuel Hoffelner (a.k.a. Manix). The duo represented Austria in the Eurovision Song Contest 2012 with the song "Woki mit deim Popo", after winning the Austrian national final, but did not pass the semi-final finishing last in the first semi-final and scored just 8 points which was the lowest of all the semi-final entrants. They were a Mundart (dialect) band with their songs being in Austrian.

Discography

Albums

Singles

Other charted songs

References

External links

Eurovision website profile

Eurovision Song Contest entrants of 2012
Eurovision Song Contest entrants for Austria